Avocado production is important to the economy of Mexico with the country being the world's largest producer of the crop. Mexico supplies 45 percent of the international avocado market.   Of the 57 avocado producing countries, the other major producers are Dominican Republic, Peru, Colombia, and Indonesia, in that order.

The 'Avocado Belt of the Mexican Republic' includes Michoacán and the State of Mexico. The major cultivars in Mexico are Fuerte, Hass, Bacon, Reed, Criollor, and Zutano.

Background
Avocado is native to Central Mexico where its ancient history, established by archaeological evidence from Claude Earle Smith Jr., who discovered avocado cotyledon remains within deposits of the Coxcatlán Cave, in Tehuacán, in Puebla state, that date back to about 10,000 years ago. Nuevo León state has remnants of primitive avocado trees. It spread to other countries in the Americas including the United States. It is a "functional food" in the Americas; the many varieties which grow in Mexico suit the climatic conditions.

Ancient residents of Mexico including the Aztecs and other indigenous groups thought that the form of a fruit contributed to its properties. Therefore, eating avocado promoted strength and virility. 16th-century Spanish colonial documentation of Indian medicinal plant usage reaffirms this association, noting the fruit's reputation as an aphrodisiac, as well as its propensity for aiding childbirth and reducing inflammation and indigestion. The avocado likely also held cultural meaning for the Maya, who believed in the rebirth of their ancestors as trees and were therefore known to surround their houses with fruit trees, including avocados.

In the 1950s, orchards of Fuerte cultivar were established; two decades later, orchards of Hass cultivar were established, and it became the country's leading cultivar. This cultivar emerged when a postal worker in Southern California, Rudolph Hass, took a leap of faith to purchase a small 1.5-acre grove in La Habra Heights to experiment with growing high-yield avocado trees. The graft he settled upon and patented in 1935 was predominantly Guatemalan with some Mexican genes. It produced fruits that were a darker shade of purple than many were accustomed to, but was tastier, less oily, and kept better. Hass’ profits from his patent through its expiration in 1960 summed a meager $4800. Today, more than 85% of avocados grown globally are of the Hass variety. Hass avocados have shown susceptibility to pests such as Persea mites and avocado thrips.

In 2007, the avocado was Mexico's fifth-ranked fruit crop. Being a staple food, the majority of avocados produced in Mexico are consumed in the country.

Production

Mexican avocado production is concentrated in Michoacán state in west central Mexico.

The favourable conditions for large production in the country is on account of availability of land, cheap labour, and rainfall pattern. Harvesting techniques incorporate hand‐held poles and baskets, picking the crop when it is mature, though still hard.

As of 2013, FAO reported 21,511 producers of avocado in Mexico out of which 10,000 were from Michoacán. This also created 279 packinghouses and domestic traders and 17 packinghouses/exporters. Fourteen processing industries came to be established which produced products such as guacamole, pulp, halves, frozen products, beverages and non-refined oil. These activities created more than 40,000 direct jobs, about 70,000 seasonal jobs, and more than 180,000 indirect permanent jobs in farming, harvesting, packing, transporting, and marketing.

Tancítaro, Michoacán has declared itself "the avocado capital of the world" and holds an annual Avocado Festival.

Supply chain 
Avocado supply chains are opaque, involve multiple actors, and cross vast distances. This opacity reduces communication across the supply chain, suppresses information on production conditions, and increases the risk of environmental and social harm. Mexican exporters maintain a farm-tracking database at the carton level, but they only communicate the country of origin to retailers and end-consumers.

Environmental impact 
Avocado plantations are associated with nearly one-fifth of deforestation in Michoacán state from 2001 to 2017. A 2021 study from The Journal of Environmental Management found that one-fourth of avocado plantations are in Key Biological Areas (KBAs), which are defined as areas vital to the preservation of threatened species. This suggests that avocado expansion in Michoacán is negatively influencing the region's biodiversity. Avocado plantations also contribute to water scarcity and pollution from agrochemical use. These pressures show no sign of abating as exports continue to climb.

Several studies point to avocado expansion as the main driver of deforestation in Michoacán.

Exports
Its export potential is constrained due to the quality of the product. Its export in the raw form is limited due to the problem of several species of avocado weevils. Beginning in 1914, the US began restricting avocado imports to reduce the chances of weevil outbreaks. These restrictions were eliminated in 1997, building on momentum from the North American Free Trade Agreement to encourage cross-continental exchange. Avocado products like avocado pulp, avocado paste and guacamole are more popular for exports, and in this form its export to the US matched the import of value of all imported fresh avocados. The exports of avocados from Mexico in the U.S reached 1.7 billion in 2016, according to AFM, as American per capita consumption of avocados has increased seven-fold from 2000 to 2016.

In February 18, 2022, Mexico and the United States agreed "to enact the measures that ensure safety" of agricultural inspectors, after one US inspector received a threat "against him and his family."

See also 
 Agriculture in Mexico
 List of countries by avocado production

References

Bibliography

Agriculture in Mexico
Production